Linda Laura Hazzard (née Burfield; December 18, 1867 – June 24, 1938), nicknamed the "Starvation Doctor" was an American quack, swindler and convicted serial killer noted for her promotion of fasting, pummeling and hours-long enemas as treatments. In 1911, Hazzard was found guilty of manslaughter in the state of Washington and was sentenced to two to 20 years of hard labor for killing at least 15 people for financial gain at a sanitarium she operated near Seattle in the early 20th century. She was released on parole after only serving two years and later, for unknown reasons, received a full pardon from Governor Ernest Lister in 1916. Hazzard died at 70 after subjecting herself to her treatment methods.

Career
Linda Laura Hazzard was born Lynda Laura Burfield in Carver, Minnesota, one of the eight children of Susanna Neil (née Wakefield) and Montgomery Burfield. Hazzard had no medical degree, but was licensed to practice medicine in the state of Washington through a loophole that grandfathered in some practitioners of alternative medicine without degrees. According to her book The Science of Fasting, she studied under Edward Hooker Dewey, MD, a well-known proponent of fasting.

Hazzard developed a fasting method that she claimed was a panacea for all manner of illnesses, ridding the body of toxins that caused imbalances in the body. Over the course of her career, she wrote three books about what she claimed to be the science behind fasting and how it could cure diseases. The first was Fasting for the Cure of Disease (1908), followed by Diet in Disease and Systemic Cleansing (1917). A fifth revised and amplified edition of Fasting for the Cure of Disease was published in 1927 under the title Scientific Fasting: The Ancient and Modern Key to Health.

Hazzard established a "sanitarium" called Wilderness Heights, located in Olalla, Washington, where inpatients fasted for days, weeks, or months on a diet consisting of small amounts of tomato, asparagus juice, and occasionally orange juice. While some patients survived and publicly endorsed Hazzard's methods, dozens died under her care. Hazzard claimed that the deceased had succumbed to undisclosed or hitherto undiagnosed illnesses such as cancer or cirrhosis of the liver. Her opponents claimed that they all died of starvation; local residents in Olalla referred to the sanitarium as "Starvation Heights".

In 1912, Hazzard was convicted of manslaughter for the death of Claire Williamson, a wealthy British woman, who weighed less than fifty pounds at the time of her death. At the trial, it was proven that Hazzard had forged Williamson's will and stolen most of her valuables. Williamson's sister, Dorothea, also took the treatment, and, it is alleged, only survived because a family friend showed up in time to remove her from Wilderness Heights. It is suggested that one of the sisters managed to smuggle a telegram to alert their governess, who lived in Australia; however, by the time of arrival, Claire had already died. Dorothea was too weak to leave on her own, weighing less than sixty pounds. She later testified against Hazzard at trial.

Hazzard was sentenced to 2 to 20 years in prison, which she served in the Washington State Penitentiary in Walla Walla. She was released on parole on December 26, 1915, after serving two years, and the following year Governor Ernest Lister gave her a full pardon. Hazzard and her husband, Samuel Chrisman Hazzard (1869–1946), moved to New Zealand, where she practiced as a dietitian and osteopath until 1920. 

In 1917, a Whanganui newspaper reported that Hazzard held a practicing certificate from the Washington state medical board. Because she used the title "Doctor", she was charged in Auckland under the Medical Practitioners Act for practicing medicine while not registered to do so, found guilty and fined £5 plus costs (approximately NZ$600 plus costs or US$462.13 plus costs in 2014). Three years later she returned to Olalla, opened a new sanitarium (known publicly as a "school of health" since her medical license had been revoked), and continued to supervise fasts until the sanitarium burned to the ground in 1935; it was never rebuilt.

Hazzard died of starvation in 1938 while attempting a fasting cure.

Earl Edward Erdman Diary
On March 28, 1910, Earl Edward Erdman, a civil engineer with the City of Seattle, died of starvation in the Seattle General Hospital. Erdman had kept a diary which detailed Hazzard's treatment during the preceding weeks that provides an insight into how she treated her patients. The following are excerpts from his diary:

This diet continued more or less unchanged until his hospitalization on March 28. He died that afternoon, just before his coworker was to transfuse blood.

Deaths attributed to Hazzard
1908
 Lenora (Mrs. Elgin) Wilcox  
 Daisey Maud Haglund (Mother of Ivar's restaurant founder Ivar Haglund) – The official cause of her death was stomach cancer. Her inability to eat would have caused her to starve to death even without Hazzard's assistance. 
 Ida Wilcox

1909
 Blanche B. Tindall
 Viola Heaton
 Eugene Stanley Wakelin – Died from a bullet in the head on Hazzard's property. Whether she was responsible for the shooting remains unknown, though it is speculated to be the case.

1910
 Maude Whitney
 Earl Edward Erdman
 L. E. Rader

1911
 Frank Southard
 C.A. Harrison
 Ivan Flux
 Claire Williamson

1912
 Mary Bailey 
 Ida Anderson 
 Robert Gramm 
 Fred Ebson – Supervised by another fast enthusiast

See also
 John Bodkin Adams – British doctor who extracted money from his patients before allegedly murdering them.
 List of serial killers in the United States

References

Further reading

External links 

 
Full report of the State v. Hazzard appeal case

1867 births
1938 deaths
American emigrants to New Zealand
American expatriates in New Zealand
American female serial killers
American people convicted of manslaughter
American prisoners and detainees
Deaths by starvation
Fasting advocates
Medical controversies in the United States
Medical serial killers
Orthopaths
People convicted for health fraud
People from Carver County, Minnesota
Place of death missing
Prisoners and detainees of Washington (state)
Pseudoscientific diet advocates
Recipients of American gubernatorial pardons
American serial killers